Liolaemus absconditus is a species of lizard in the family  Liolaemidae. It is native to Argentina.

References

absconditus
Reptiles described in 2018
Reptiles of Argentina
Taxa named by Laura Estela Vega
Taxa named by Andrés Sebastián Quinteros
Taxa named by Oscar Aníbal Stellatelli
Taxa named by Patricio Juan Bellagamba
Taxa named by Carolina Block
Taxa named by Enrique Alberto Madrid